Henryk Korab-Janiewicz (January 16, 1897 – August 11, 1971) was a Polish-American businessman, historian, social activist and three-time president of the Józef Piłsudski Institute of America.

Life and activity

He was born on January 16, 1897, in Warsaw. In 1911, he became active in scouting and in the Riflemen's Association. In 1915, arrested by the Russians and transported deep east into Russia. Returned to Poland in 1919 and received a recommendation to enroll in a military trade school. Next, Korab-Janiewicz finished the Wyższa Szkoła Handlowa in Warsaw and worked as chairman of the International Association of Trade and Consignment "Metokko" as well as in the Polish State Loan Agency.

In 1924 he moved to Paris, where he studied and worked as one of secretaries general for the Association for Protection of Polish Immigrants in France. In 1928 he moved to the United States and settled in the state of New Jersey, where he launched the Ampol Film Co. and worked for the editing staff of the daily "Dziennik dla Wszystkich". In 1935, Korab-Janiewicz established a factory of meat products called "Pasco" and initiated the creation of a Buffalo branch of the Polish Maritime and Colonial League.

In 1940 he was elected president of the American Polonia Council in New Jersey. In 1947 he became a member of the Józef Piłsudski Institute of America and between 1955 and 1969 he served as its president, with two short breaks. On September 26, 1962, he was granted honorary membership of the Institute. Korab-Janiewicz died in Short Hills, New Jersey on August 11, 1971.

Bibliography
  Biogram Henryka Koraba-Janiewicza na stronie Instytutu Józefa Piłsudskiego w Ameryce

1897 births
1971 deaths
Polish emigrants to the United States
Polish activists
Polish businesspeople
20th-century American businesspeople
Individuals associated with the Józef Piłsudski Institute of America